The Battle of the Persian Border was the second encounter between the forces of Media and Persia. Though not a decisive victory for Persia, it signaled the diminishing power of Media in Southwest Asia. It was the first battle Cambyses I had fought in, and the first which he had fought with his son, Cyrus the Great.  The first major battle, which lasted two days, was an attempt to bring freedom to Persia. It also prompted the Persians to retire south, and fight a third battle.

It was narrated by Nicolaus of Damascus, among others, who also mentioned the Battle of Hyrba, but Herodotus does not mention this battle. Most historians on the battle consider Herodotus to be mentioning only the first and last battles in the war, which is partly based on the description of his two battles. At the border this became the first major battle between the two powers. Cyrus managed to escape the enemy without retreating, thus ending the battle and prolonging the struggle without a complete victory for Astyages, the king of the Medes. The next battle, the Battle of Pasargadae,  became the last stand for the Persians; as their very existence relied on the outcome.

Background
Cyrus had retired to the border of the Median province to protect the Persian border against Astyages. After the Battle of Hyrba, Astyages invaded Persia. The battle that was to come was composed of cavalry from both sides, and chariots that in most part were used for the battle, for they were never used again. A small part of the invasion force from the Medes participated in the battle, while the Persians spent all their cavalry from their reserves. Astyages had tried to persuade Cyrus to surrender but he now preferred to show no mercy even though he had better relations with Atradates (the variant name of Herodotus' Mitradates, which Nicolaus mistakenly uses for Cambyses, the father of Cyrus).  The name of the city Cyrus and his father were protecting was not given.  Nevertheless, the city was an important frontier town worth the protection. When Astyages came within reach of the city, Persian civilians were ready to evacuate if necessary.  Meanwhile, Cyrus and Cambyses assembled the army, but it is not exactly known whether Oebares (who helped Cyrus to the throne) or Harpagus participated on the side of Cyrus in the battle, it is known that the original Oebares was an advisor to Cyrus. So Nicolaus, as he is known to change names around, may most likely be saying Harpagus was in the battle, as he was historically Cyrus's second in command and the only other choice available, but in this battle it seems Oebares was on Cyrus' side. Then it could also be said as Herodotus mentions, Harpagus was the most likely candidate that was in this battle that occurred about a year after the first battle.  Therefore, as battle began, Astyages had his special troops positioned to attack at the rear.

Motives

Battle

Aftermath
After the first day's battle the Persians had either inflicted massive casualties on Astyages' personal guard that was made up of cavalry, or the rest of his army that was also cavalry. Nevertheless, the Persians still claimed victory the first day. The second day of the battle Cyrus, assuming the battle had ended, secretly retired south with the rest of the armed forces, while only Cambyses and a few old men remained in the city. When Cyrus was forced to fight again, Astyages' ingenious move of cavalry occurred, which was aimed at capturing the poorly guarded city. As he was assuming the battle had not ended, he easily captured the city, while only Cambyses is reported to have been wounded and later died. It is debated among today's historians if the second day is to be counted as part of the original battle, or that it should be counted as a separate battle. As the Persians retired south, Astyages readily abandoned the city, which is based partly on the scant sources from Nicolaus, therefore not becoming a complete victory for Astyages, as he is not known to put a garrison there after he and his forces went south after the Persians. It was however a psychological blow to the Medes as they thought the Persians were lucky in the first battle, but again the Persians won, this time tactically. Both armies later went back to their camps and organized their armies while deciding where to meet for the next fight. Then as the year passed, both forces agreed to meet at the Persian capital which Astyages wished to capture.

See also

Notes

References
Max Duncker, The History of Antiquity, tr. Evelyn Abbott. London, Richard Bentley & Son (1881). 
Anderson Edward, Robert, The Story of Extinct Civilizations of the East, Published by McClure, Phillips, (1904). 
Fischer, W.B., Ilya Gershevitch, and Ehsan Yarshster, The Cambridge History of Iran, Cambridge University Press (1993). In 1 volume. 
Chisholm, Hugh, The Encyclopædia Britannica: A Dictionary of Arts, Sciences, Literature and General Information, Cambridge, England; New York: At the University Press, (1910). 
Laymon, Charles M., The Interpreter's One Volume Commentary on the Bible: Introduction and Commentary, Abingdon Press, (1971). 
Clare, Israel Smith. The unrivaled history of the world, containing a full and complete record of the human race from the earliest historical period to the present time, embracing a general survey of the progress of mankind in national and social life, civil government, religion, literature, science and art... Chicago, The Werner Co., (1893).

Bibliography

Classical sources

Ctesias (Persica)
Fragments of Nicolaus of Damascus

Modern sources
 Rawlinson, George (1885).The Seven Great Monarchies of the Eastern World, New York, John B. Eldan Press, reprint (2007) p. 120-121. In 4 volumes. 
 Fischer, W.B., Ilya Gershevitch, and Ehsan Yarshster, The Cambridge History of Iran, Cambridge University Press (1993)  p. 145. In 1 volume. 
 Stearns, Peter N., and Langer, William L. (2004).The Encyclopedia of World History: Ancient, Medieval, and Modern, Chronologically Arranged, Boston, Houghton Mifflin Press, (2001) p. 40. In 6 editions.

External links
  M. A. Dandamaev, A Political History of the Achaemenid Empire, tr. W. J. Vogelsang, (1989) the battle.
 James Orr, The International Standard Bible Encyclopaedia, Chicago, The Howard-Severance Co. (1915) the combatants.
 Hastings' Dictionary of the Bible other details.

551 BC
Persian Border
Persian Border
Persian Border
6th century BC